WJ Stay? is the sixth extended play by South Korean-Chinese girl group WJSN. It was released on January 8, 2019, by Starship Entertainment and Yuehua Entertainment, and distributed by kakao M. It contains a total of seven songs, including the lead single "La La Love". This is the last album to feature former members Xuanyi, Cheng Xiao and Meiqi after they had departed from the group, following the expiration of their contracts, in March 2023.

Background and release 
On December 24, 2018, Starship Entertainment revealed through its official social media accounts that WJSN would release a new album on January 8, 2019.

It was reported that members Meiqi, Xuanyi, and Cheng Xiao will not participate in their album's promotions due to activities in China, but took part in the recording of "Memories".

WJSN members Exy and Dawon participated in the writing and production of the seventh track "Ujung". Exy is also credited as a co-writer on all tracks.

On the day of the album's release, the music video of the lead single "La La Love" was also released.

Track listing

Charts

Weekly

Monthly

Release history

References 

Korean-language EPs
Cosmic Girls EPs
Starship Entertainment EPs
2019 EPs